Watch is the fourth and final album of the band Seatrain, recorded in 1973. It is marked with the departure of Peter Rowan and Richard Greene (they formed the band Muleskinner) and the use of more session musicians on instruments like vibraphone, cello, accordion, tuba and oboe. Original members Andy Kulberg and Jim Roberts still remained with the group, though Roberts only contributed to three of the album's nine tracks.

Reception

In a brief retrospective review, Allmusic called Watch "A strange, but intriguing release."

Track listing 

 "Pack of Fools" (Andy Kulberg, Jim Roberts) 4:35
 "Freedom Is the Reason" (Kulberg, Roberts) 4:15
 "Bloodshot Eyes" (Lloyd Baskin) 3:00
 "We Are Your Children Too" (Baskin) 3:42
 "Abbeville Fair" (Kulberg, Richard Greene) 4:54
 "North Coast" (Kulberg, Roberts) 4:23
 "Scratch" (Kulberg) 3:45
 "Watching the River Flow" (Bob Dylan) 3:23
 "Flute Thing" (Al Kooper) 7:52

Personnel

 Julio Coronado - drums
 Bill Elliot - keyboards, accordion
 Lloyd Baskin - keyboards, vocals
 Andy Kulberg - bass, flute, vocals
 Peter Walsh - guitar, bass, vocals
 Jim Roberts - vibraphone

with
 Bill Keith - banjo
 Wayne Daley - vocals
 Paul Prestopino - dobro, acoustic guitar
 Jill Shires - flute
 Douglas Davis - cello
 Bonnie Douglas - violin
 Myra Kestenbaum - viola
 Sandra Lee - vocals
 Buell Neidlinger - bass
 Sha Na Na - vocals
 Paul Shure - violin
 Bob Stuart - tuba
 Allan Vogel - oboe

References

1973 albums
Seatrain (band) albums
Warner Records albums
Wounded Bird Records albums